Adolf Ritter von Tutschek (1891-1918) was a German First World War fighter ace credited with 27 confirmed aerial victories. After scoring his first three aerial victories flying combat with Jagdstaffel 2 in early 1917, he transferred to command of another fighter squadron, Jagdstaffel 12. Tutschek shot down another 20 enemy aircraft by 11 August 1917. After recovery from a severe wound, he was promoted to command a fighter wing, Jagdgeschwader II, on 1 February 1918. He scored four more victories there before being killed in action on 15 March 1918.

List of victories

His victories are reported in chronological order, which is not necessarily the order or dates the victories were confirmed by headquarters. Downed pilots are listed before their aerial observers.

This list is complete for entries, though obviously not for all details. Background data was abstracted from Above the Lines: The Aces and Fighter Units of the German Air Service, Naval Air Service and Flanders Marine Corps, 1914–1918, p. 219; Under the Guns of the Kaiser's Aces: Bohme, Muller, von Tutschek and Wolff: The Complete Records of Their Victories and Victims, pp. 100–137; and The Aerodrome webpage on Adolf Ritter von Tutschek . Abbreviations were expanded by the editor creating this list.

References

Aerial victories of Tutschek, Adolf Ritter von
Tutschek, Adolf Ritter von